Giant is an American melodic rock band that was formed in 1987. The band originally consisted of founding members Dann Huff (lead vocals and guitar) and Alan Pasqua (keyboard), and had Dann's brother David Huff on drums and Mike Brignardello on bass. The Huff brothers were part of the founding members of the Christian rock band White Heart.

The band scored one hit, the 1990 power ballad "I'll See You in My Dreams", written by Alan Pasqua and Mark Spiro.

Giant disbanded in the early 1990s after recording two albums, but resurfaced in 2000 minus Alan Pasqua and released the album III in late 2001.

In December 2009, Frontiers Records announced that they would release Giant's fourth studio album Promise Land in 2010. The band included Terry Brock (Strangeways, Seventh Key) on lead vocals and John Roth (Winger) on guitars. Dann Huff was not a part of the band due to his busy schedule, but he co-wrote seven songs and guested on guitar on two. The album was released on February 26, 2010 for Europe and March 9, 2010 for the US.

Giant released their first studio album in 12 years, entitled Shifting Time, on January 21, 2022.

Members

Current 
 Kent Hilli – lead vocals (2021–present)
 John Roth – guitars, backing vocals (2009–present)
 David Huff – drums, backing vocals (1987–1992, 2000–present)
 Mike Brignardello – bass, backing vocals (1987–1992, 2000–present)

Past 
 Dann Huff – lead vocals, guitars, keyboards (1987–1992, 2000–2002, 2017)
 Alan Pasqua – keyboards, backing vocals (1987–1992)
 Jeff Peterson – guitars, backing vocals (touring) (1987–1990)
 Mark Oakley – guitars, backing vocals (touring) (1990–1992, 2017)
 Larry Hall – keyboards, backing vocals (touring) (1992)
 Terry Brock - lead vocals (2009-2021)

Discography

Studio albums
 Last of the Runaways (1989)
 Time to Burn (1992)
 III (2001)
 Promise Land (2010)
 Shifting Time (2022)

Live albums
 Live and Acoustic – Official Bootleg (2003)

Compilation albums
 It Takes Two + Giant Live (1990)

Extended plays
 Don't Leave Me In Love (2001)

Singles

See also
List of glam metal bands and artists

References

1987 establishments in Tennessee
1992 disestablishments in Tennessee
A&M Records artists
Epic Records artists
Frontiers Records artists
Glam metal musical groups from Tennessee
Hard rock musical groups from Tennessee
Musical groups from Nashville, Tennessee
Musical groups established in 1987
Musical groups disestablished in 1992
Musical groups reestablished in 2000